Bartholomew of Neocastro ( 1240 – after 1293) was an Italian jurist, and author of a chronicle called the Historia Sicula, which covers the years from 1250 to 1293.

References

1240s births
Year of death missing
Writers from Sicily
Italian chroniclers
13th-century Latin writers
13th-century Italian jurists